Zeargyrodes fasciatus is a species of beetle in the family Cerambycidae, and the only species in the genus Zeargyrodes. It was described by Fisher in 1925.

References

Apomecynini
Beetles described in 1925
Monotypic beetle genera